Dead Men at the Folly is a 1932 detective novel by John Rhode, the pen name of the British writer Cecil Street. It is the thirteenth in his long-running series of novels featuring Lancelot Priestley, a Golden Age armchair detective. It was published in the United States by Dodd Mead.

Synopsis 
A dead body found at the foot of a large folly draws the attention of Hanslet Scotland Yard and with him Doctor Priestley.

References

Bibliography
 Evans, Curtis. Masters of the "Humdrum" Mystery: Cecil John Charles Street, Freeman Wills Crofts, Alfred Walter Stewart and the British Detective Novel, 1920-1961. McFarland, 2014.
 Herbert, Rosemary. Whodunit?: A Who's Who in Crime & Mystery Writing. Oxford University Press, 2003.
 Reilly, John M. Twentieth Century Crime & Mystery Writers. Springer, 2015.

1932 British novels
Novels by Cecil Street
British crime novels
British mystery novels
British detective novels
Collins Crime Club books
Novels set in London